The Celebrity Bulletin is a magazine which reports on people in the arts, business, education, politics, religion, science and sports. It was founded by society impresario Earl Blackwell (1909–1995) in 1952. Originally a weekday (New York) or thrice weekly (Paris, London, Hollywood and Rome) four-page magazine, it is now published bi-weekly.Researching for the Media: Television, Radio and Journalism, Adele Emm (2014), p. 56  International versions, published weekly, are also available.

The magazine is published by Blackwell's Celebrity Service, which initially had offices in New York and Hollywood but later expanded to include London, Paris and Rome. Subscriptions to Celebrity Service cost $12.50 a month, for which the customer receives daily bulletins on celebrity movements. Alternatively, they can phone at any time for "special inside information". The bulletin is now available via the Celebrity Service website.Our Services – Celebrity Service International official website

The magazine's longtime editor, Bill Murray, died in his office of an apparent heart attack on March 2, 2010.

References

External links

The February 10, 2011, edition of The Celebrity Bulletin – StudyLib

Daily magazines published in the United States
News magazines published in the United States
Celebrity magazines published in the United States
Lifestyle magazines published in the United States
Magazines established in 1952
1952 establishments in New York City
Celebrity fandom